Donald Ray Sellers (December 30, 1974 – February 11, 2001) was an American football player, playing professionally at wide receiver for the Scottish Claymores of NFL Europe.

Sellers attended Ellison High School in Killeen, Texas and was a two-year letterman in football, basketball, and baseball. He also played at University of New Mexico and Trinity Valley Community College as a quarterback.

Sellers died in a car crash on February 11, 2001, after losing control of his vehicle outside Wickenburg, Arizona and hitting an oncoming car.

In 2010, he was inducted into the Trinity Valley Community College Hall of Fame.

References 

1974 births
2001 deaths
American football quarterbacks
American football wide receivers
Trinity Valley Cardinals football players
New Mexico Lobos football players
Scottish Claymores players
Road incident deaths in Arizona
Las Vegas Outlaws (XFL) players
Players of American football from Phoenix, Arizona